Tazeh Kand or Tazekhkend (Azerbaijani for "New (literally, "Young") Village") may refer to:

Ardabil Province
Tazeh Kand-e Mohammadiyeh, a village in Ardabil County
Tazeh Kand-e Rezaabad, a village in Ardabil County
Tazeh Kand-e Sharifabad, a village in Ardabil County
Tazehkand-e Chenaq, a village in Bileh Savar County
Tazeh Kand-e Aguti, a city in Germi County
Tazeh Kand-e Langan, a village in Germi County
Tazeh Kand-e Muran, a village in Germi County
Tazeh Kand-e Qarah Bolagh, a village in Germi County
Tazeh Kand-e Galvazan, a village in Khalkhal County
Tazeh Kand Gandomabad, a village in Khalkhal County
Tazeh Kand, Meshgin Shahr, a village in Meshgin Shahr County
Tazeh Kand-e Hajji Khan, a village in Meshgin Shahr County
Tazeh Kand-e Yuzbashi, a village in Meshgin Shahr County
Tazeh Kand, Namin, a village in Namin County
Tazeh Kand-e Jadid, a village in Parsabad County
Tazeh Kand-e Kian, a village in Parsabad County
Tazeh Kand-e Qadim, a city in Parsabad County
Tazeh Kand-e Sabalan, a village in Sareyn County
Tazeh Kand Rural District (Parsabad County)

East Azerbaijan Province

Ahar County
Tazeh Kand-e Davudlu, a village in Ahar County
Tazeh Kand-e Masqaran, a village in Ahar County
Tazeh Kand-e Nasirabad, a village in Ahar County
Tazeh Kand-e Niq, a village in Ahar County
Tazeh Kand-e Shahverdi, a village in Ahar County
Tazeh Kand-e Tahmasb, a village in Ahar County
Tazeh Kand-e Yaft, a village in Ahar County

Bonab County
Tazeh Kand-e Isa Khani, a village in Bonab County
Tazeh Kand-e Khusheh Mehr, a village in Bonab County
Tazeh Kand-e Zavaraq, a village in Bonab County

Bostanabad County
Tazeh Kand, Bostanabad, a village in Bostanabad County
Tazeh Kand, Abbas-e Gharbi, a village in Bostanabad County
Tazeh Kand, Ujan-e Sharqi, a village in Bostanabad County

Charuymaq County
Tazeh Kand-e Sowlati, a village in Charuymaq County

Hashtrud County
Tazeh Kand-e Qarajeh Qayah, a village in Hashtrud County

Heris County
Tazeh Kand, Heris, a village in Heris County
Tazeh Kand, alternate name of Guydaraq Kandi, a village in Heris County
Tazeh Kand-e Nahand, a village in Heris County
Tazeh Kand-e Olya, Heris, a village in Heris County
Tazeh Kand-e Sarand, a village in Heris County

Jolfa County
Tazeh Kand, Jolfa, a village in Jolfa County

Khoda Afarin County
Tazeh Kand-e Vinaq, a village in Khoda Afarin County

Malekan County
Tazeh Kand-e Hurilar, a village in Malekan County
Tazeh Kand-e Khan Kandi, a village in Malekan County
Tazeh Kand-e Sheykh ol Eslam, a village in Malekan County

Maragheh County
Tazeh Kand, Maragheh, a village in Maragheh County
Tazeh Kand-e Aliabad, a village in Maragheh County
Tazeh Kand-e Gol Chavan, a village in Maragheh County
Tazeh Kand-e Nasirpur, a village in Maragheh County
Tazeh Kand-e Olya, Maragheh, a village in Maragheh County
Tazeh Kand-e Qarah Naz, a village in Maragheh County
Tazeh Kand-e Sofla, a village in Maragheh County
Tazeh Kand-e Qeshlaq, East Azerbaijan, a village in Maragheh County

Marand County
Tazeh Kand-e Akhvond, a village in Marand County

Meyaneh County
Tazeh Kand-e Divan Ali, a village in Meyaneh County
Tazeh Kand-e Poruch, a village in Meyaneh County

Sarab County
Tazeh Kand, Howmeh, a village in Sarab County
Tazeh Kand, Sain, a village in Sarab County

Shabestar County
Tazeh Kand, Chelleh Khaneh, a village in Shabestar County
Tazeh Kand, Rudqat, a village in Shabestar County
Tazeh Kand, Sis, a village in Shabestar County

Tabriz County
Tazeh Kand, Tabriz, a village in Tabriz County
Tazeh Kand Rural District (Tabriz County)

Varzaqan County
Tazeh Kand, Varzaqan, a village in Varzaqan County

Hamadan Province
Tazeh Kand, Bahar, a village in Bahar County
Tazeh Kand, alternate name of Deh Now, Bahar, a village in Bahar County
Tazeh Kand, Hamadan, a village in Hamadan County
Tazeh Kand, Razan, a village in Razan County
 Roderick Syme

Kurdistan Province
Tazeh Kand-e Madan, a village in Kurdistan Province

West Azerbaijan Province

Chaldoran County
Tazeh Kand, Baba Jik, a village in Chaldoran County
Tazehkand, Chaldoran-e Shomali, a village in Chaldoran County

Khoy County
Tazeh Kand, Khoy, a village in Khoy County

Maku County
Tazeh Kand, Maku, a village in Maku County
Tazeh Kand-e Adaghan, a village in Maku County
Tazeh Kand-e Ilan Qarah, a village in Maku County
Tazeh Kand-e Towlim Khan, a village in Maku County

Miandoab County
Tazeh Kand, Miandoab, a village in Miandoab County
Tazeh Kand, Baruq, a village in Miandoab County
Tazeh Kand-e Hajj Hasan, a village in Miandoab County
Tazeh Kand-e Hasel-e Qubi, a village in Miandoab County
Tazeh Kand-e Lalaklu, a village in Miandoab County

Naqadeh County
Tazeh Kand-e Deym, a village in Naqadeh County
Tazeh Kand-e Jabal, a village in Naqadeh County

Poldasht County
Tazehkand, Poldasht, a village in Poldasht County
Tazehkand, Zangebar, a village in Poldasht County

Shahin Dezh County
Tazeh Kand, Shahin Dezh, a village in Shahin Dezh County

Showt County
Tazeh Kand, Showt, a village in Showt County

Takab County
Tazeh Kand-e Nosratabad, a village in Takab County

Urmia County
Tazeh Kand, Urmia, a village in Urmia County
Tazeh Kand, Nazlu, a village in Urmia County
Tazeh Kand, Sumay-ye Beradust, a village in Urmia County
Tazeh Kand-e Afshar, a village in Urmia County
Tazeh Kand-e Anhar, a village in Urmia County
Tazeh Kand-e Baba Ganjeh, a village in Urmia County
Tazeh Kand-e Jamalkhan, a village in Urmia County
Tazeh Kand-e Janizeh, a village in Urmia County
Tazeh Kand-e Qaterchi, a village in Urmia County
Tazeh Kand-e Qeshlaq, West Azerbaijan, a village in Urmia County

Zanjan Province
Tazeh Kand, Zanjan, Iran
Tazeh Kand, Ijrud, a village in Ijrud County
Tazeh Kand-e Fakhrlu, a village in Mahneshan County
Tazeh Kand, Tarom, a village in Tarom County
Tazeh Kand-e Hasanabad, a village in Zanjan County
Tazehkand-e Ziaabad, a village in Zanjan County

See also
Tazakend (disambiguation)
Təzəkənd (disambiguation)